Scaeosopha convexa is a species of moth of the family Cosmopterigidae. It is found on Borneo.

The wingspan is 13–17 mm. The ground colour of the forewings is yellow, overlaid with yellowish-brown and black spots or patches. The hindwings are greyish brown.

Etymology
The species name refers to the triangular projection at the middle of the ventral margin of the valve and is derived from Latin convexus (meaning convex).

References

Moths described in 2012
Scaeosophinae